Bangladesh participated in the 1998 Asian Games which were held from December 6 to December 20, 1998, in Bangkok, Thailand.

Medalists

See also
 Bangladesh at the Asian Games
 Bangladesh at the Olympics

References

Nations at the 1998 Asian Games
1998
Asian Games